Juddha Paolo is a Filipino actor.

Biography

Juddha grew up in the States.  He came to the Philippines to join the Philippine amateur boxing team.  Instead, he found his way to show business.  He became a Star Magic talent.  He was launched later under Star Magic Batch 9.  He then appeared in Coca-Cola's Hottah Hottah Summer Ad with Paolo Paraiso and Brian Tan.

In 2003, he, along with Paolo Paraiso and Brian Tan, was cast in Tabing Ilog.

He later joined in Studio 23's first VJ search.  He was picked along with Kat Alano, Beau Canlas and Ayanna Oliva.

In 2007, he portrayed a small role in Rounin and at the same time appeared in Pinoy Mano-Mano: The Celebrity Boxing Challenge, a boxing reality show featuring celebrities.  He had to leave the show due to a joint injury in one of the undercard bouts.

He also works with the ABS-CBN Foundation's "Kapit-Bisig Para Sa Ilog Pasig," a campaign to help rehabilitate the Pasig River.

Filmography

Television

Film

References

Living people
Star Magic
Year of birth missing (living people)